is a railway station in the city of Iwata, Shizuoka Prefecture, Japan, operated by the third sector Tenryū Hamanako Railroad.

Lines
Kaminobe Station is served by the Tenryū Hamanako Line, and is located 24.4 kilometers from the starting point of the line at Kakegawa Station.

Station layout
The station has one side platform serving a single bi-directional track. There is no station building, but n enclosed wooden shelter on the platform. The station is unattended.

Adjacent stations

|-
!colspan=5|Tenryū Hamanako Railroad

Station History
Kaminobe Station was established on May 6, 1955 as part of the Japan National Railways Futamata Line. After the privatization of JNR on March 15, 1987, the station came under the control of the Tenryū Hamanako Line.

Passenger statistics
In fiscal 2016, the station was used by an average of 11 passengers daily (boarding passengers only).

Surrounding area
The station is located in a rural area with no settlement nearby

See also
 List of Railway Stations in Japan

References

External links

  Tenryū Hamanako Railroad Station information 
 

Railway stations in Shizuoka Prefecture
Railway stations in Japan opened in 1955
Stations of Tenryū Hamanako Railroad
Iwata, Shizuoka